Ago-Oba is electoral ward 13 in the city of Abeokuta, Ogun State, Nigeria.
It is part of the Abeokuta South Local Government Area.

Location

Ago Oba (Camp of the Oba) is a community in the egba section of Abeokuta whose people claim to originate from the ancient Oba kingdom. It is not clear whether Ago Oba was formed due to migration of Egba tpeople during the 19th Century Yoruba wars, or whether the people arrived at an earlier time. The villages under Oba Kingdom are following  Pakudi village,Agbamaya village, Lodan village.oluribido village.Abuletuntun village, Olorunda village,Ikeja village.omilende village,Agbanikanda village,Igboti village,Akija village 

The main economic activities are trading, textile making, artisan work and transportation activities.
Houses tend to be occupied by from six to twenty people, using shallow wells for water. This water does not meet World Health Organization standards, and when untreated creates a serious health risk.
In the past, the ward has been subject to perennial flooding, but recently efforts have been made to improve the drainage.
The Anglican community in Ago-Oba parish is served by St. Michael's Church.

Notable people

Former Ogun state governor Olusegun Osoba holds the traditional title of Oluwo of Ago-Oba, among others.
In the April 2011 Presidential elections Osoba cast his vote in Ago-Oba for candidate Nuhu Ribadu of the Action Congress of Nigeria. Ribadu was the clear winner in the ward, with 142 votes to 65 for the PDP and 5 for the CPC.
Former President Olusegun Obasanjo is of the Owu people. When his wife Stella Obasanjo died in 2005, her body was brought from Lagos to the Winners Chapel in Ago-Oba, from where she was taken to be buried in the Obasanjo family compound in nearby Ita-Eko.
Alexander Abiodun Adebayo Bada (1930 - 2000), second leader of the Celestial Church of Christ Worldwide, was son of the Baale, or paramount head of Ago-Oba, a former president of the Ikeja customary court in Lagos and the organist of the African Church in Ereko-Lagos.
The Seriki of Egbaland, Dr. Lateef Adegbite, has his office in Ago-Oba.

References

Ogun State
Nigerian royalty
Communities in Yorubaland